Shakhen Rural District is in Shakhenat District of Birjand County, South Khorasan province, Iran. At the National Census of 2006, its population (as a part of the Central District) was 6,276 in 1,609 households. There were 5,130 inhabitants in 1,587 households at the following census of 2011. At the most recent census of 2016, the population of the rural district was 5,372 in 1,675 households. The largest of its 13 villages was Shakhen, with 1,342 people. After the census, the rural district and Shakhenat Rural District were separated from the Central District to establish Shakhenat District.

References 

Birjand County

Rural Districts of South Khorasan Province

Populated places in South Khorasan Province

Populated places in Birjand County